Inklings are a fictional species of terrestrial squid and are the primary playable characters in the Splatoon video game series by Nintendo. They have also made crossover playable appearances in other Nintendo games, such as Mario Kart 8 Deluxe and Super Smash Bros. Ultimate.

Concept and design
The player characters of Splatoon were originally anthropomorphic rabbits with the ability to burrow through solid surfaces they splattered with ink, and this choice was considered because rabbits are highly territorial animals by nature. However, the idea was concerning to the designers, who felt that there was a clash between the characters' appearances and the ink-based gameplay. Designers came up with the idea for squid-like Inklings that were able to hide and swim in ink. The "missile-like" shape of their head was a good complement to the Inklings' movement according to the development team. When designing the Inklings the designers centered around it being female at first, which they stated was because there were not many other female leads in Nintendo games at the time. The Inklings were designed to be teenagers since the developers wanted to give the image of a strong, rebelling character, while having the attitude of being "cool".

Abilities  
Inklings can switch between humanoid and squid forms. As humanoids, they are able to wield weapons. As squids, they are able to hide in and swim through ink. Their increased mobility in squid form is further enhanced by their squid roll and surge abilities that grant them bursts of movement with added protection. In humanoid form, Inklings can splatter a special type of colored ink by using various weapons, including guns, rollers, buckets, and paintbrushes. Each weapon has different attributes that affect mobility, paint output, and splatting power. Inklings also have a variety of special and sub weapons that come with each main weapon ranging from shields and bombs to tactical airstrikes and ink-based bazookas. Inklings also have the ability to revive after being splatted through the use of respawn points.

Inklings have a glaring weakness to water; they are splatted instantly when more than half of their body is submerged in it. They are also relatively frail as they cannot sustain a lot of damage before being splatted. All of their weaponry is also purely ink-based, rendering their attacks useless against any ink-proof coating, and they lack any combat abilities without a weapon, sub, or special. Their mobility in humanoid form is rather sluggish, rendering them vulnerable on un-inkable surfaces.

Appearances
Inklings originally appeared as playable characters in Splatoon, later appearing in Splatoon 2 and Splatoon 3. Inklings have also appeared as fighters in Super Smash Bros. Ultimate and as drivers in Mario Kart 8 Deluxe. Inkling outfits appear in Animal Crossing: Pocket Camp. A costume based on girl Inklings are featured in the Taiko no Tatsujin series.  Inkling-inspired clothing was also introduced to Miitomo.

Reception

The Inklings' aesthetic design have received a positive critical reception from multiple video game publications following the release of the first Splatoon, and have since become a popular subject for cosplay activities. The integration of the Inklings' physiological characteristics into the gameplay mechanics of the Splatoon series have been praised, as it allowed players to explore a unique tactical concept. The Inklings have appeared in multiple "top" character lists. Polygon staff in particular ranked two notable Inkling characters, the "Squid Sisters" Callie and Marie, among the 70 best video game characters of the 2010s decade; they were described as an example of how Nintendo elevated "anthropomorphized squids and made them into pop sensations". The creative decision by Nintendo to remove the option to specify player character gender from Splatoon 3 onwards was met with praise.

Before being announced for Super Smash Bros. Ultimate, Inkling was a popular choice for inclusion in the roster by multiple websites, including GamesRadar and Paste. Mike Williams of US Gamer included Inkling Girl on his list of most-wanted characters, saying that her inclusion would be "free money." Screen Rant ranked Inklings as 5th best character to use in Super Smash Bros. Ultimate. Jeremy Parish of Polygon ranked 73 fighters from Super Smash Bros. Ultimate "from garbage to glorious" and placed the Inklings at 13th place. In 2018, Paste magazine writer Holly Green rated the Inklings as her favorite of the new fighters in Smash Bros. Ultimate. Gavin Jasper of Den of Geek ranked the Inklings 17th on his list of Super Smash Bros. Ultimate characters.

The Inklings' crossover appearances in other media, such as Mario Kart 8 Deluxe have also been well received. However, multiple journalists criticized one of the Inkling girl's taunt gestures for Mario Kart 8, as it was deemed to be offensive.

Merchandise
An Amiibo set containing Inkling Girl, Inkling Boy, and Inkling Squid was released to accompany Splatoon, and recolors of the original Amiibos were released. A set of new Amiibos for Splatoon 2 were released. A separate Inkling Girl Amiibo was released to accompany Super Smash Bros. Ultimate. An Inkling  figma was released by Good Smile. A beanie designed to resemble an Inkling's hair was given away as a pre-order bonus for Splatoon by GAME. Plush toys of the Inklings (and various other characters from the series) were released from San-ei, with distribution outside of Japan by Little Buddy.

References

Splatoon
Anthropomorphic video game characters
Child characters in video games
Teenage characters in video games
Fictional humanoids
Fictional squid
Child superheroes
Shapeshifter characters in video games
Nintendo protagonists
Nintendo characters
Silent protagonists
Video game characters introduced in 2015
Video game characters of selectable gender
Super Smash Bros. fighters
Video game species and races
Third-person shooter characters